Universitetskaya Square is a big open space in front of the Moscow State University on Sparrow Hills in Ramenki district, in the southwest of Moscow. It is one of the biggest squares in the world, covering an area of approximately 130,000 m². The square was created during the construction of new territory of Moscow State University in 1949–1953 and got its name in 1956.

References

Squares in Moscow